The Chairman of the Supreme People's Assembly is the presiding officer of the Supreme People's Assembly, the legislature of North Korea.

The Supreme People's Assembly elects a chairman to preside its sessions. Vice chairmen are elected alongside the chairman.

From 1972 until 1998, the chairman of the Supreme People's Assembly was concurrently the Chairman of the Standing Committee of the Supreme People's Assembly.

The current chairman is Pak In-chol, who was elected on 23 January 2023.

List of office holders

References

Supreme People's Assembly
Parliamentary titles